Caroline Sheridan may refer to:

 Caroline Norton (1808–1877), née Sheridan, English social reformer and author 
 Caroline Henrietta Sheridan (1779–1851), English novelist